Gilan Derby or Classic Gil is a three-way derby between soccer teams in Rasht  and Anzali  in Gilan province. These matches are one of the most sensitive sporting events in Iran. The first derby occurred in 1976, with the confrontation between Sepidrud and Malavan in the first round of the Hazfi Cup. This game ended in favor of the students of Bahman Salehnia with two goals from Ghafour Jahani and Aziz Espandar.

History
At first, the city is facing a battle between Malavan's Whites and Sepidrood's Reds. The two rooted teams in Iran's football, which are the culmination of the two teams' participation in the Gilan League, were not yet launched in Iran. Due to the loss of Sepidrood and the continuous and long-running presence of Rasht's representative in the lower classes of Iranian football for many years, the friendly and sometimes official meetings of the two teams have not attracted a certain attraction and sensitivity as before. But still the old soccer fans of Guilan know these two clubs as traditional rivals of Gilan Derby.

In the past few years, with the start of the Pro League in Iran, Damash team, previously playing with the two other Names of Esteghlal Rasht and Pegah Gilan, represented Rasht in Gilan Derby, but with Sepidrood returning to first tier in 2016 and Malavan's falling from the Pro League in the same year, the competition continued in its traditional form.

Gilan football fans have always been attracted by their full participation in the competition. The presence of three old and rooted clubs in Gilan province has increased the sensitivity of the game among the people.

The highest number of spectators in the tournament is due to the return of the Sepidrood and Malavan teams at Azodi Stadium in Rasht, in the category of a football in Iran in 1396. According to the official statistics of the organization, 25,000 Gilani fans (15,000 capacity) were close to the observer.

Date of establishment of clubs
Damash: It was established in 1960 under the name of Taj Rasht, later renamed Abouzar Rasht, then Esteghlal Rasht Municipality, then Pegah Gilan and finally Damash, which has a history of twelve seasons in the Premier League and has been a finalist in the Iranian Football Cup twice. .

Sepidrood: In 1968, this team was formed with the name of Salamatbakhsh Rasht and in 1973, the name Sepidrood was chosen for this club. This team became the champion of the 1977 Aga Khan Gold Cup in Bangladesh, which is one of the most famous Asian Cups of its time. Also, this popular and private team in the north of the country returned to the first level of Iranian football in 2017 after 25 years.

Malavan: Established in 1969. This team is one of the most successful teams in Iran in the Iranian Hazfi Cup with three championship titles.

Malavan vs Sepidrood Results

Summary of results

Trophies

Top goal scorers

Damash vs Malavan Results

Summary of results

Trophies

Summary of total results

See also
 Football in Iran
 Tehran Derby
 Isfahan Derby
 Mashhad Derby
 Persepolis F.C.–Sepahan S.C. rivalry
 Esteghlal F.C.–Sepahan S.C. rivalry
 Persepolis F.C.–Tractor S.C. rivalry
 Esteghlal F.C.–Tractor S.C rivalry
 Major football rivalries

References

Football derbies in Iran
Football in Iran